Mountain Springs is a spring in the Spring Mountains in Clark County, Nevada.

History
John C. Frémont described the spring when his expedition encountered it while exploring what became the Fremont Cutoff on May 1, 1844:
 

William Chandless, an Englishman traveling the Mormon Road on horseback from Salt Lake City to Los Angeles, rode up to Mountain Springs from Las Vegas Springs on January 18, 1856. He described the route and the spring thus:

Leaving the springs, Chandless took the Kingston Cutoff, a horse mail trail, which ran 40 waterless miles from Mountain Springs to Kingston Springs and another 40 miles to Bitter Spring, linking up again with the Mormon Road along Salt Creek in Silurian Valley.

References

Bodies of water of Clark County, Nevada
Spring Mountains
Old Spanish Trail (trade route)
Mormon Road
Springs of Nevada